Khatling Glacier is a glacier located in the Tehri Garhwal district of Uttarakhand in India.

Wildlife 
In 2016, snow leopards were spotted for the first time near the glacier by the Wildlife Institute of India.

References

Glaciers of Uttarakhand
Tehri Garhwal district